Gatecreeper is an American death metal band from Phoenix, Arizona.

History
Gatecreeper released a self-titled four song EP in 2014. In 2015, Gatecreeper released a split with the band Take Over and Destroy. In 2016, the band was featured on a split with Homewrecker, Outer Heaven, and Scorched. In 2016, Gatecreeper released a split with the band Young and in the Way. 

In 2016, Gatecreeper released their debut full-length album on Relapse Records titled Sonoran Depravation.

In 2015, Gatecreeper played the first show at The Rebel Lounge—former site of the Mason Jar—with The Atlas Moth and Take Over and Destroy.

In August of 2019, Gatecreeper announced their new album Deserted, that was released on October 4, 2019 on Relapse Records. Loudwire named it one of the 50 best metal albums of 2019.

In January 2021, they released An Unexpected Reality. The album was ranked number fourteen on Revolvers list of the "25 Best Albums of 2021".

Band members
Current
Chase "Hellahammer" Mason – vocals (2013–present)
Eric "The Darkest Cowboy" Wagner – guitars (2013–present)
Matt Arrebollo – drums (2013–present)
Israel Garza – guitars (2020–present)
Alexander Brown - bass (2021-present)

Former
Max Nattsblod – guitars (2013–2015)
Nate "Jack Maniacky" Garrett – guitars (2015–2019)
Sean "Hell Mammoth" Mears – bass (2013–2021)

Touring members
Tommy Cantwell - drums (2017)
Josh "Hallhammer" Hall – drums (2017)

Discography
Studio albums
Sonoran Depravation (2016, Relapse)
Deserted (2019, Relapse)

EPs and splits
Gatecreeper (2014, King Of The Monsters, Protagonist Music)
Gatecreeper / Take Over and Destroy (President Gator, Common Wall Media LLC)
Gatecreeper / Homewrecker / Outer Heaven / Scorched (Escapist Records)
Gatecreeper / Young and in the Way (2016, A389 Recordings)
Sweltering Madness (2017, Closed Casket Activities)
Gatecreeper / Iron Reagan (2018, Relapse Records)
An Unexpected Reality (2021, Closed Casket Activities)

References

2013 establishments in Arizona
Heavy metal musical groups from Arizona
Musical groups established in 2013
Musical quintets
American death metal musical groups